Cody McKinley Morris (born November 4, 1996) is an American professional baseball pitcher for the Cleveland Guardians of Major League Baseball (MLB). He played college baseball at the University of South Carolina, and was drafted by the Cleveland Indians in the seventh round of the 2018 MLB draft. He made his MLB debut in 2022.

Career
Morris attended Reservoir High School in Fulton, Maryland. He was drafted by the Baltimore Orioles in the 32nd round of the 2015 Major League Baseball draft, but did not sign and played college baseball at the University of South Carolina. He was then drafted by the Cleveland Indians in the seventh round of the 2018 MLB draft.

Morris made his professional debut in 2019 with the Lake County Captains and Lynchburg Hillcats. Over 21 games (twenty starts) between the two teams, he went 7–4 with a 4.35 earned run average and 111 strikeouts over 89 innings. He did not play a minor league game in 2020 since the season was cancelled due to the COVID-19 pandemic. He started 2021 with the Akron RubberDucks before being promoted to the Columbus Clippers. He appeared in 15 games (making 14 starts) between the two teams, going 2–2 with a 1.62 earned run average and 93 strikeouts over 61 innings.

The newly named Cleveland Guardians selected Morris to their 40-man roster on November 19, 2021. He began the 2022 season on the major league 60-day injured list with a shoulder injury. After completing his rehab assignment with the Triple-A Columbus Clippers, Morris was activated from the injured list on September 1, 2022. He made his major league debut on September 2, 2022, starting against the Seattle Mariners.

References

External links

1996 births
Living people
Akron RubberDucks players
Baseball players from Maryland
Cleveland Guardians players
Columbus Clippers players
Lake County Captains players
Lynchburg Hillcats players
Major League Baseball pitchers
People from Columbia, Maryland
South Carolina Gamecocks baseball players